Giancarlo Ceccarelli (born 31 August 1956 in Frascati) is a retired Italian footballer. He played as a midfielder.
After playing in Lazio youth teams he went to play in Serie B for 4 years, during which he gained a promotion in Serie A with Avellino. After a relegation with Sambenedettese he continued his career in Serie C1 and Serie C2 and retired in 1985.

Career
1973–1976  Lazio 0 (0) 
1976–1977  Brescia 1 (0) 
1977–1978  Avellino 26 (2) 
1978–1981  Sambenedettese 62 (3) 
1981–1982  Rende 33 (2) 
1982–1983  Forlì 16 (0) 
1983–1984  Giulianova 27 (3) 
1984–1985  Olbia 34 (0)

References

External links

1956 births
Living people
People from Frascati
Italian footballers
S.S. Lazio players
A.S. Sambenedettese players

Association football midfielders
Footballers from Lazio
Sportspeople from the Metropolitan City of Rome Capital